The R724 road is a regional road in County Carlow, Ireland. From its junction with the R448 at Royal Oak on the western edge of Muine Bheag Town it takes an easterly route crossing the River Barrow, the R705 regional road and the Dublin – Kilkenny railway line in the town. 

It continues east to Fennagh and Myshall, before terminating in Kildavin at the N80. The entire route is within County Carlow.

See also
Roads in Ireland
National primary road
National secondary road

References
Roads Act 1993 (Classification of Regional Roads) Order 2006 – Department of Transport

Regional roads in the Republic of Ireland
Roads in County Carlow